Taylor Township is one of eleven townships in Howard County, Indiana, United States. As of the 2010 census, its population was 9,294 and it contained 4,138 housing units.

Geography

The stream of Taylor Run runs through this township.

Cities and towns
 Kokomo

Unincorporated towns
 Center (Tampico)
 Hemlock (Terre Hall)
 Oakford (Fairfield)
(This list is based on USGS data and may include former settlements.)

Former Settlements
 Indian Heights (Annexed into Kokomo in 2012)
 Guy

Adjacent townships
 Howard Township (north)
 Liberty Township (northeast)
 Union Township (east)
 Wildcat Township, Tipton County (southeast)
 Liberty Township, Tipton County (south)
 Prairie Township, Tipton County (southwest)
 Harrison Township (west)
 Center Township (northwest)

Cemeteries
The township contains three cemeteries: Albright, Chandler and Poff.

Major highways

Library
Kokomo-Howard County Public Library South Branch, (SWC) Center and Albright roads

Schools
Taylor High School
Taylor Middle School

Post Offices
Oakford Post Office

Businesses

Hotels/Bed & Breakfasts
Courtyard Inn, (SEC) Kentucky Drive and US 31 (near US 31 and Center Road)
Days Inn & Suites, (NEC) Albany Drive and US 31
Holiday Inn Express, (SEC) Albany and Clinton drives (near US 31 and Alto Road)
Super 8, Clinton Drive between Albany and Kentucky Drives (near US 31 and Alto Road)

Food
Applebee's, (SEC) Southway Boulevard and US 31
Arby's, (SEC) Arrow Street and US 31 (near US 31 and Center Road)
Burger King, (NEC) Arrow Street and US 31 (near US 31 and Center Road)
Cracker Barrel, (NEC) Kentucky and Clinton drives (near US 31 and Center Road)
McDonald's, (SEC) Alto Road and US 31
Outback Steakhouse, (SEC) Southway Boulevard and US 31
Pizza Hut, (NEC) Center Road and US 31
Starbucks Coffee, (NEC) Alto Road and US 31 (opening Summer 2008)
Subway, (SEC) Arrow Street and US 31 (near US 31 and Center Road)

Gas
BP, (SEC) Center Road and US 31
Citgo, (NEC) Center Road and CR 344 E
Gas America, (NEC) US 31 and SR 26
Speedway, (NEC) Center Road and US 31

Pharmacy
CVS/pharmacy, (SEC) US 31 and SR 26

References
 U.S. Board on Geographic Names (GNIS)
 United States Census Bureau cartographic boundary files

External links
 Indiana Township Association
 United Township Association of Indiana

Townships in Howard County, Indiana
Kokomo, Indiana metropolitan area
Townships in Indiana